Body inflation is the practice of inflating or pretending to inflate a part of one's body, often for sexual gratification. It is commonly done by inserting balloons underneath clothes or a skin-tight suit and then inflating them. Some people have specially made inflatable suits, commonly made from latex rubber, to make themselves bigger all over. One of the best-known examples is Mr. Blowup, who appears in the Deviant Desires book. He wears air-inflated double-skinned latex suits, and has made a number of TV appearances in the UK, including Eurotrash. Sometimes the body is actually inflated also, such as by enema or drinking large amounts of liquid. 

One of the most famous examples of body inflation in popular culture is of Violet Beauregarde from Charlie and the Chocolate Factory/Willy Wonka & the Chocolate Factory, where she swells up into an anthropomorphic blueberry after eating an experimental chewing gum consisting of a three-course meal which is tomato soup, roast beef with baked potato and blueberry pie with ice cream. Another example is Mammoth Mutt from Krypto the Superdog, a member of Dog Star Patrol whose superpower is inflating herself to enormous sizes, the biggest nearly as big as the Patrol's spaceship.

Other inflatable fetishists generate erotic stories, artwork, video, and audio files to indulge their fantasies. Sexual roleplay is also fairly common, either in person or via online conversation. The notion of the fantasy scenarios ending in popping or explosion is often a divisive topic in the community.

The first inflatable fetish community organized online in 1994, in the form of an e-mail list; as the popularity of online communication grew, so did the online community.

See also
 Balloon fetish
 Belly fetish
 Breast fetishism
 Fat fetishism
 Inflatable doll
 Pregnancy fetishism

References

Body image in popular culture
Internet culture
Paraphilias
Sexual fetishism
Sexual roleplay